K. Narayana Kurup (23 October 1927 – 26 June 2013) was an Indian senior leader of Kerala Congress (Mani), a splinter faction of Kerala Congress. He was a former Minister and Deputy Speaker in Kerala, India and a former MLA from Vazhoor in Kottayam district.

References

2013 deaths
1927 births
Deputy Speakers of the Kerala Legislative Assembly
People from Kottayam district
Kerala MLAs 1970–1977
Kerala MLAs 1977–1979
Kerala MLAs 1991–1996
Kerala MLAs 1996–2001
Kerala MLAs 2001–2006